John Setor Dumelo (born 3 February 1984) is a Ghanaian actor, farmer and politician. On 1 April 2014 he emerged as the first Ghanaian to hit a million likes on Facebook. His parents are Mr. John Dumelo who was a Civil Engineer and Mrs. Antoinette Dumelo a Customs Officer.

Early life and education 
Dumelo was born in Ghana and had his basic education at Christ the King School in Accra.
 
He attended Achimota School was part of the Drama Club and also won the Fliers Guy  in Mo-TOWN prize. and further studied Civil Engineering at Kwame Nkrumah University of Science and Technology. He contested in "Mr University" won at KNUST. Later, he enrolled in GIMPA's School of Public Service and Governance. He started acting in the early 1990s in a 1991 movie called Baby Thief while he was attending Christ the King School and was paid 20 thousand old Ghana Cedis (currently 2 Ghana Cedis) at age 7 years.

Personal life 
John Dumelo is married to Gifty Mawunya Nkornu. He held a grand wedding at Royal Senchi Resort in Akosombo. The couple's first child was born on 16 October 2018. He is named John Dumelo Jnr. after his father.

Filmography 
He has acted in several films, including:

4Play
40 Looks Good on You
A Northern Affair (2014)
Adams Apples film series (2011–2012)
A Private Storm (2010)
A Night with Her
After the Wedding
Black Men Rock (2018)
Blackmoney (2012)
Beautiful Ruins  (2016)
Baby Thief (1991)
Blind Lust
Chelsea
Suncity
Crime Suspect
Double Cross   (2014)
End of Mirror of Life (2011)
End of Brides War
End of the Maidens
Final Innocent Sin
Ghetto Queen
Gold Not Silver
Hearts of men (2009)
Hero
Holy Secret
Humble Hero
Hunted House
If God Be for Us (2016)
Letters to my Mother
Love Alone
Love or Something Like That (2014)
Marriage Planner
Mirror of Life
Men in Love (2010)
My Fantasy
Never Again
One Night in Vegas
One in a Million
Of Sentimental Value
Queens Pride
Single Six
Single, Married and Complicated
Secret Shadows
Tales Of Nazir – The Movie"
The Game (2010)
The King is Mine
The Maidens
The Perfect Picture
The Perfect Picture - Ten Years Later
The Prince Bride
The Snake Boy
The Supremo
Ties that Bind
To Love a Prince

Accolades

Business ventures 
Aside being an actor of international recognition, John Dumelo is an entrepreneur. He launched his clothing line (J.Melo) in 2012. The Actor is also known to be involved in both Crop and Animal farming.

Engagement in politics 
During the National Democratic Congress (Ghana) NDC Party's Campaign In 2016, Dumelo was one of the most influential and outstanding celebrities who were seen campaigning for the NDC Government. Rumours have spread that, as an appreciation for his engagement and patriotism to the Party, he was called and appointed by the former president of Ghana H.E John Dramani Mahama, to serve his Party as a Director of Operations for pro-NDC youth group for the National Democratic Congress (NDC).

John Dumelo on the 19th of July 2019, picked up a nomination form to contest in the NDC primaries as a parliamentary candidate . On August 24, 2019, he won the NDC parliamentary primaries to represent the NDC in Ayawaso West Wougon Constituency in the 2020 General Elections. He successfully launched his campaign manifesto for the 2020 Election on Sunday 18 October 2020 promising to commit half of his salary to youth development in the constituency if voted for. On December 7, 2020, John Dumelo lost the parliamentary elections to the New Patriotic Party (NPP) incumbent Lydia Alhassan for the Ayawaso West Wuogon Constituency.

Honor 
In January 2023, he was honored by the University of Ghana for his philanthropic gestures to their students.

References

External links 
 
 

Ghanaian male film actors
1984 births
Living people
Alumni of Achimota School
20th-century Ghanaian male actors
21st-century Ghanaian male actors
Ghanaian male child actors
National Democratic Congress (Ghana) politicians
Ghanaian politicians